The Nantou County Culture Park (NCCP) is a historical building in Nantou City, Nantou County, Taiwan.

History
The park's main building, County History Hall, was built in 1937 as the Wude Temple. It was unveiled as Nantou County History Hall in 1997 but soon later it was closed due to 921 earthquake in 1999. After a year of reparation, it was reopened to the public in 2000. Adjacent to the County History Hall is the Art Archive Hall which was originally built in 1952. It was later changed to its current use in 2003.

Exhibitions
 County History Hall
 Nantou Pottery Exhibition Hall
 County History Reference Hall
 Art Archive Hall

See also
 List of tourist attractions in Taiwan

References

1937 establishments in Taiwan
Buildings and structures in Nantou County
Tourist attractions in Nantou County